Dakor is a small city and a municipality in Kheda district in the state of Gujarat, India. It is prominent for its grand temple of Shree Ranchhodraiji.

Legends; History; Temple architecture

Dakor, in its earlier phases as pilgrimage center in Gujarat, was famous for the Danknath temple, a place of shiva worship. In the later phases it developed into a Vaishnavite center with the growing fame of Ranchhodraiji [form of Lord Shri Krishna] temple, which was built in 1772 A.D. Today this place is known not only as a pilgrimage center but also a trading center where one can get the articles related to puja, and other rituals. Recently, Dakor is included in one of the six major pilgrimage places under "Yatradham Vikas Board" by Government of Gujarat for development as a well-planned and well-organised pilgrimage place to facilitate the lacs and lacs of visiting pilgrims. More than 70–80 lacs of pilgrims visit the place every year and a continuous increase is witnessed every year.

Temple Information [ranchhodraiji.org]
	 	 
Over the years, much has changed at Dakor. From a small village of Dankapur, it has now transformed itself into a major center of religious and commercial activity in the region. The small shrine of the original temple is now encased in a large temple complex, which has grown up around it. The current temple complex is set in a large square setting. Four gates pierce the outer walls at the cardinal points. Various offices and storerooms are set around the outer perimeter of the temple. The actual temple is set on a high platform in a complex, set in the style of medieval temples from the region.

The form of Lord Ranchhodrai is that of the Lord Vishnu with four arms. As is usual with Lord Vishnu, he bears the conch, lotus, discus and the mace in his hands. The lower right arm is held up in the abhaya mudra - giving protection to all those who come to Him. There may be a lotus imprinted on the hand, but it is impossible to confirm that without getting really close to the Lord. As the Lord here is worshipped more as Krishna than Dwarkadhish, i.e. younger and freer than the mature Lord of Dwaraka, His right hand is often shown to hold a flute – a favorite instrument of the Lord in His younger days. The upper right hand holds the mace, the upper left hand holds the discus and the lower left hand holds the conch. Ordinarily, it is difficult to see these "ayudhas" of the Lord in His hands. During festivals, the hands encased in gloves of gold studded with gems.

Temple Architecture  [ranchhodraiji.org]
 
The present temple was constructed by Shri Gopalrao Jagannath Tambwekar in 1772 A.D. at the cost of rupees one lakh. It was built with brick walls and stones pillars. It is raised on a high plinth of 168 feet by 151 feet with twelve stone steps on each side and surrounded by a spacious courtyard. It has eight domes and twenty–four turrets, the highest of them being 90 feet making it the tallest temple in the district. The main gate of the temple overlooks the (now crowded) banks of the lake Gomati. Silver gates are protected by the Vedic Gods - Lord Ganesha, Sun, Moon, etc. beautifully carved in high relief. The gate leads into the main courtyard. As tradition would have it, drummers sit atop the main gate in a balcony of their own. The "Nagarkhana" resonates with music during the main darshans and at Aarti times. On entering the courtyard, one sees two tall structures, used to house the thousands of lamps that are lit during the festive season, on either side. Multi-storied and multi-tiered, this type of structure is very typical of medieval Gujarati temple architecture. Back at the front gate, marble stairs lead to the main audience chamber of the temple - the Jagmohan - literally the place where the world is charmed (by the beauty of the Lord). Three large entrances allow devotes to enter the main audience chamber. The large open square structure of the audience chamber is surmounted by an imposing, glittering dome. Till recently, the dome was painted with Shri Krishna's rasa-lila in the classical Bundi style. Recently, this has been replaced by an intricate inlay of mirror work, depicting flowers and trellis in a classical Rajput garden. Painted murals from Lord Krishna's life adorn the walls of the audience chamber. A small section at the front of the chamber is railed off and reserved for women. As with all classical temples, the inner sanctum of Ranchodrai is set in a straight line from the main gate of the temple. The Lord sits under a canopied pavilion in the inner sanctum. The whole structure is raised on a marble platform and the pillars of the pavilion are covered in gold. The intricately carved doors and windows to the inner sanctum are covered in silver. There are three doors leading into the inner sanctum. Door to the right of the Lord comes in from the antechamber, leading to a special bathroom where the priests must bathe before entering the inner sanctum. Corridors from here, also lead to the treasure house of the Lord – housing His innumerable jewels and clothes. The door in front of the Lord faces the main audience chamber. At Dakor, the Lord spends as much time as possible with His devotees. The main doors to the inner sanctum are open most of the day. The doors only close when the Lord sleeps – during the afternoon and at night. The door to the left of the Lord leads to the bedchamber of the Lord - a mirrored chamber of thousand delights. Various beds, mattresses and blankets are neatly arranged in here for the Lord's comfort. Silver and gold bedsteads are covered in soft cottons and silks. Perfumes and garlands are kept in readiness for the Lord. A small corridor leads from here to the open hall behind the bedchamber, where pilgrims perform various religious rituals to please the Lord. As at Badrinathji in the Himalayas and Tirupati Balaji in South India, at Dakor, the temple of Goddess Lakshmi, wife of the Lord, is situated outside the main temple. Lakshmiji's temple is situated in a residential part of town at a little distance from the main temple. It is believed that the Lord visits His wife on every Friday – on Fridays a courtly procession winds its way from the main temple down the lanes and bylanes of Dakor to unite the couple.

History of Dakor and temple

In the times of Mahabharata, the surrounding area of Dakor constituted the 'Hidamba' van (jungle). It was a very dense jungle. It was pleasant and rich with streams and lakes. It had become an attraction for the sages to establish their hermitage for penance. Likewise, Dank Rishi had his hermitage (ashram) in this area. During penance Lord Shiva was pleased with him and asked him to demand something. Thereupon, Dank Rishi requested Lord Shiva to remain permanently in his hermitage. Lord Shiva agreed to his request. He disappeared and left behind him His replica in the form of Ban (Ling), which is known as Danknath Mahadev. Thus in ancient times, Dakor was known as 'Dankor' after the name of Dankanth Mahadev. It was also known as khakhariya because of many khakhra (palash) trees in the vicinity.

Legend

The present Dakor owes its raison d'etre not to Dank Rishi but to Bodana, a great devotee of Lord Krishna. In his previous birth, he is supposed to have lived in Gokul and been a cowherd called Vijayanand. On one 'Holy' day, all the cowherds except Vijyanand worshipped Lord Krishna. His wife too worshipped Lord Krishna. But Vijayanand was proud and stayed at home. Lord Krishna came to his house in disguise of his friend and sent him to perform 'Holi' puja. Coming back, he realised that his friend was none else but Lord Krishna. Next day they fought a battle of colour. Lord Krishna lost and fell into the river. Vijyanand went after him where Lord Krishna revealed his true self. Vijyanand begged forgiveness. Lord Krishna took pity on him and solaced him with a boon that he would be born in Gujarat again in Kali Yuga after 4200 years as Vijayanand Bodana in the house of a Krishatriya and his present wife Sudha would again be his wife, called Gangabai, when he will give them a glimpse (darshna) and relieve them by offering them emancipation (Moksha). 
So as the legend would have it, 'Vijayanand Bodana', a rajput of Dakor, becomes a staunch devotee of Lord Krishna. He used to let the basil plant (Tulsi) grow in an earthen pot with him on his palm and used to go every six months to Dwarika to worship Lord Krishna with the said Tulsi leaves. He did this continuously, unfailingly and untiringly till he was 72 years he then began to find it increasingly difficult to pursue this ritual. Seeing his plight, Lord Krishna told him that on his ensuing visit to Dwarika, he should bring a bullock-cart with him and Lord Krishna would accompany him to Dakor as he was exceedingly pleased with his devotion. Accordingly, Bodana went with bullock-cart to Dwarika. Hindu Vaghers who were the 1st hereditary priests of Dwarika handled over the temple to gugli Brahmins due to their indulgence in fighting freedom wars against British empire. So these 2nd priest tribe of Dwarika (Gugli Brahmins) asked bodana as to why he had brought a cart with him. Whereupon, Bodana replied that he had done so to take away Lord Krishna. Looking to the ramshackle cart, they did not believe him but nevertheless locked and sealed the sanctum sanctorum of Dwarika Temple for the night. At midnight, Lord Krishna broke open all the doors, awoke Bodana and told him to take him to Dakor. Shortly afterwards, Lord Krishna called upon Bodana to rest in the bullock-cart and drove the cart himself till reached the vicinity of Dakor. Here (near Bileshwar Mahadev on Dakor-Nadiad road) they rested for some time, touching and holding a branch of neem tree. He woke up Bodana and asked him to take over. Since that day, this neem tree is found to have one sweet branch though the rest of the branches are bitter and it forms the subject of a well-known Gujarati song (bhajan). 
In Dwarika, the Gugli Brahmins finding the image missing chased Bodana and came to Dakor in pursuit. Bodana was frightened but Lord Krishna told him to hide the idol of the deity in the Gomti tank and meet the Guglis. Accordingly, Bodana hid the idol and went to meet the Guglis with a pot of curd to pacify them. They became angry and one of them threw a spear at him. He fell down dead While hurting Bodana with a spear it also hurt the image of the deity hidden in Gomti tank and the water turned red with Lord Krishna's (Ranchhodraiji's) blood. It is said that even today the earth of Gomti tank where the image lay is red while rest of the tank is of brown mud. In the midst of Gomti tank, over the place where Lord Krishna was hidden, a small temple having the Lord's foot-prints is constructed and this temple is linked with the bank of Gomti Tank by a bridge. Even with the death of Bodana, the Guglis were not appeased. Requesting Lord Krishna to return to Dwarika, they sat on the bank of Gomti tank and went on a hunger strike. At last, Lord Ranchhodraiji (Krishna) directed Gangabai, wife of Bodana, to give gold equivalent of his weight and ask the Guglis to return to Dwarika. Poor lady, the widow of Bodana, was a pauper and could not afford to do so. By a miracle, the idol became as light as a golden nose-ring (1, 1/4 val i.e.1/2 gram in weight) which was all that the widow of Bodana Gangabai had. The Guglis were disappointed but the Lord mercifully directed that they would find after six months an exact replica of the idol in Savitri Vav at Dwarika. The impatient Guglis looked for the idol sometime earlier than they were told and as a result, found an idol which, though similar to the original one, was smaller, Pilgrims to Dakor still visit the places stated to have been associated with the legend viz. Where the branch of neem tree under which Lord rested while coming to Dankpur subsequently turned sweet; where the idol was hidden in the Gomti tank; whereon the balance was set up to weigh the original idol which Bodana had enshrined.

History since forth

Shri Gopal Jagannath Tambwekar approached Peshwas and Gaikwars and requested them to grant lands for the maintenance, (puja, worship, prosperity, naivedya and services and ceremonials etc.) for the expenses of the deity from the State. Thereupon, Peshwa Madhavrao Ballal Pradhan, Peshwa of Poona granted the entire village of 'Dakor' of Taluka Thasra, District Kaira and Damaji Gaikwar's son Sayajirao Gaikwar of Baroda granted in Inam (Offered as prize) village 'Kanjari', Prant Madhudha of Gujarat. At that time i.e. in 1769 A.D. half of Kaira District was with Peshwas of Poona and half was with Gaikwars of Baroda. At present, village Kanjari is in Nadiad Taluka of Kaira District. The two entire villages of Dakor and Kanjari were given in Inam to Shri Gopal Jagannath Tambwekar hereditarily for the services of the deity, Shri Ranchhodraiji. Both these villages are known as Dakor Sansthan. Sansthan Scheme was framed in the Year 1879 for the necessary, essential and entire expenses, services and ceremonials of the deity Shri Ranchhodraiji and Goddess Laxmiji which were exclusively met with from the fixed income of the revenues of the two villages of Dakor and Kanjari and was later on registered as a Public Trust. It is the original foundation trust of Shri Ranchhodraiji Maharaj. Since 1905, the management of the temple rests with the Temple Committee. In pursuance of a decision of the Privy Council, Dakor Temple Scheme was finally approved by the Privy Council in 1916. In 1952, it was registered as a Public Religious Trust. Thus the Temple Trust is not administered by the Government, but a Committee consisting of Vaishnav devotees of Lord Krishna conducts its day-to-day administration under the supervision of Manager as per the provisions laid down under the Dakor Temple Scheme. The Committee consists of three nominees of the District Court from Vaishnavas . one hereditary representative of Tambwekar family and one from the Sevaks (priests). The priests are of three sub-castes of Brahmins, viz. Khedaval, Shrigod and Tapodhan. At present families of these priests are about 232 in number. The term of the trustee expires every ten years. Temple committee also maintains a Gaushala. Its strength is 600 cattle. Cows are not sold. They are maintained throughout their lifetime. Bulls are given free of cost to needy Gram Panchayats for breeding purposes.

Darshan

The temple normally opens at about 6:45 A.M. and closes at 12 Noon between which there are five darshans namely, Mangla, Bal bhog, Shringar bhog, Gwal bhog and Rajbhog during which Aartis are performed. In the afternoon, it reopens at about 4:15 P.M. and closes at 7:30 P.M. In between there are three darshans namely, Usthapan, Shyan and Shakhdi bhog. At Utthapana Bhoga and Shayana bhoga Aaratis are performed. The Darshana timings on Full Moon days are different and are declared by the temple authorities beforehand. For the convenience of the vaishnavas desirous to offer additional bhogs to the deity except the scheduled ones, there is a provision in the Dakor Temple Scheme and accordingly, Mahabhog, Rajbhog and additional bhogs are offered to the deity.

Festival

On full moon days, people visit the temple to seek the blessings as was done by the devotee who brought Shree Krishna to the temple. So there is a great inflow of people and the town is very crowded. There is a carnival or fair taking place around February and March, on the day of festival of Holi and Vijaydashmi observed by all Hindus as a mark for triumph of the truth and goodness. Many people from surrounding cities come and visit the temple during these festivals, some from even far away.

Sarad Purnima, which comes after end of Navratra, is the day believed on which lord Krishna came to Dakor as ranchodrai with his great devotee known as Bodana. Lord come to Dakor to fulfill the promise that he will come to Dakor with Bodana.

There are many festivals and many festival photos are on the website of www.ranchhodraiji.org

 Sharad Purnima
  Krishna Janmotsav (Janmasthami), then Second Day of Janmastami (Nand Mahotsav) 
  Holi
  Rathyatra
 Diwali 
 Bestu Varsh (Hindu New Year) 
 After New year "Annakut Mahotsav"
 Every Friday & Every Agyaras Ranchhod Ray ji ( Gopallal Ji ) went at Laxmiji Temple
  Amali ekadasi(Amliagiyaras)
 Tulsi Vivah 
 Dashera
 Hindoda
 Gopalnathji
 Navkavihar

Geography
It has an average elevation of 49 metres (160 feet).

Connectivity (only bus and railway)

Dakor is connected through rail and road.  is a station on the Anand–Godhra Broad Gauge rail line. Anand and Nadiad are around 30 km away and both are very much connected by rail and roads. Ahmedabad and Vadodara are about 90 km away and both cities are connected with rail, road and by air.

Demographics
 India census, Dakor had a population of 23,784. Males constitute 53% of the population and females 47%. Dakor has an average literacy rate of 76%, higher than the national average of 59.5%: male literacy is 82% and, female literacy is 69%. In Dakor, 10% of the population is under 6 years of age.

References

External links

Ranchhodrai Temple Website

Hindu holy cities
Cities and towns in Kheda district
Tourist attractions in Kheda district